Eissporthalle (literally: ice sports hall) is German for an indoor ice rink. Most of them are used for ice hockey.

Specific ice rinks include:
Eissporthalle Frankfurt
Eissporthalle Gletscher
Eissporthalle Iserlohn
Eissporthalle Kassel
Eissporthalle an der Jafféstraße

German words and phrases